The Empress Theatre (also known as Cinéma V), is an abandoned Egyptian Revival style theatre located on Sherbrooke Street west in the Notre-Dame-de-Grâce district of Montreal, Quebec, Canada. It closed in 1992.

History

Built in 1927 and designed by Joseph-Alcide Chaussé, with interiors by Emmanuel Briffa, it is the only theatre in Canada designed in the Egyptian style (inspired by the discovery of Tutankhamen's tomb). Opened as the Empress Theatre, the building was a vaudeville theatre for burlesque and first-run films. In 1962 it was a dinner theatre called the Royal Follies.  In 1968 it  became a two-tiered art-movie cinema known as Cinema V and Salle Hermes. In 1974 it was briefly named The Home of the Blue Movies and in 1975 it became simply Cinema V, a repertory cinema. In 1988 it was acquired by Famous Players and showed first-run films. In 1992 a fire caused damage to the theater resulting in its permanent closure. In 1999, after several years of abandonment, the city of Montreal took ownership of the building.

Current state

The abandoned building is deteriorating and its perimeter fenced off. In 2005 community organizers opened a small one room office on the ground floor (left corner of building; location of a former health food store) as a headquarters for the building's restoration. The office was permanently closed by the borough in December 2011, and no longer heated after 2013, leaving the building vacant and continuing to deteriorate. In the years since, it has been repeatedly vandalized, windows broken (now bordered up), and covered with graffiti. In 2020, the theater was officially declared structurally unsound and the roof at risk of collapse, after 30 years of neglect and abandonment.

Failed preservation attempts

Geordie-BTW-McGill
In November 2009, after several unsuccessful attempts to revive the theater over the years, Geordie Productions , Black Theatre Workshop, McGill Music Conservatory and the City of Montreal announced plans to restore the building. The estimated cost was $11.8 million. The theatre was to be used for performance and visual arts and included a cafe/art gallery and a 246-person concert hall. It was to be home to Geordie Productions and Black Theatre Workshop, and the McGill Conservatory had planned to use the theatre for its music program.

In August 2010, the provincial government pulled funding and announced ownership would be returned to the city of Montreal by November. Residents of NDG formed Renaissance Empress, a group dedicated to preserving the theatre and transforming it into a cultural centre, and delayed the move. On August 15, 2011, the NDG borough seized ownership, effectively canceling the project.

Cinema NDG
In January 2012, the borough of N.D.G. announced that any non-profit group with a new plan for the building should present it by May 11, 2012. The city stated that it would not provide any funding for the building.

On September 5, 2012, the borough voted to accept Cinema NDG's proposal. Their plan was to open a movie theater with four screening rooms and set aside 20% of the building for commercial use. Restoration of the building was estimated at $12 million. Cinema NDG was given until December 31, 2013, to find financial backing, but failed to meet the deadline. Two extensions were granted during 2014 and 2015, but Cinema NDG failed to meet these as well. On November 2, 2015, the city voted to grant a third and final extension, for June 30, 2016, but yet again Cinema NDG failed to meet the deadline, forfeiting the project.

In late September 2016, in hope of a new start, Cinema NDG submitted a revised and scaled back plan to the city, bringing the estimate cost down to $9.5 million. However, the city did not show willingness to accept a new plan, and furthermore stated under no circumstance would it transfer ownership of the building unless Cinema NDG could prove it had secured 100% of the funding. Meanwhile, other cinemas continued to close in Montreal and throughout North America, including the Montreal cinema and performing arts centre Excentris in November 2015.

MK2
In October 2017, a new citizens formed group was announced: Friends of the Empress. Expressing an interest in reopening the theater, the group called for more transparency and public consultations for the project. It also proposed a pop-up sidewalk stand to solicit the opinions of residents. These efforts were thwarted by the Cinema NDG group, which accused the Friends of the Empress group of playing politics for trying to make the process more democratic. A week later, without any consultation with local stakeholders, the French film company MK2 signed a letter of intent to partner with Cinema NDG (now known as Empress Theater Foundation) to run an 880-seat cinema out of the building, with 5 rooms, a restaurant, a bar and a coffee shop. However, no financial details had been set, nor had the city made any new agreement. Efforts by the Friends of the Empress to obtain information about the contract were denied by local councillors.

In August 2018, it had been reported MK2 cut ties with the Empress Theater Foundation and withdrew from its agreement. This had left the project to revitalize the theater, yet again, to fall apart and ultimately fail. The building remained in a dangerous state of decay and was at serious risk of facing demolition.

Pending demolition
In March 2020, CTV News reported the CDN-NDG city borough plans to demolish the former Empress theater. An audit shows the building is now structurally unsound, its concrete degraded, and overall in poor shape, with even its roof at risk of collapse. It has not been decided if a complete or partial demolition will be done, but there is a possibility its neo-Egyptian exterior facade could be preserved and used in a new building. However, with its advanced decay by neglect, it is currently unknown if even the facade can be saved at this point. Additionally, costs would substantially balloon for developers to save any part of the building, making the feasibility of preserving the facade questionable. Montreal's public housing agency claims "affordable" housing (condos) will be built in its place, with commercial and possibly community space on the ground floor. This announcement marked the end of the nearly century old landmark. However, as of March 2023, the building has remained untouched and continues to deteriorate.

References

External links

Empress Theatre Foundation
Article from The Suburban
Article from The Montreal Gazette, April 13, 2010
Article from The Montreal Gazette, May 14, 2010
CTV story
Empress Theatre / Cinema V on Heritage Montreal's Website

Egyptian-style theaters
Theatres completed in 1927
Theatres in Montreal
Côte-des-Neiges–Notre-Dame-de-Grâce
Former theatres in Canada
Cinemas and movie theatres in Montreal
Former cinemas in Montreal